The hyphen barb (Enteromius bifrenatus) is a species of ray-finned fish in the  family Cyprinidae.

It is found in Angola, Botswana, Republic of the Congo, Malawi, Mozambique, Namibia, South Africa, Zambia, and Zimbabwe.

Its natural habitat is rivers. It is not considered a threatened species by the IUCN.

References 

Enteromius
Cyprinid fish of Africa
Freshwater fish of Angola
Fish of Malawi
Fish of Mozambique
Fish of South Africa
Fish of Zambia
Taxa named by Henry Weed Fowler
Fish described in 1935
Taxonomy articles created by Polbot